Cleopatra "Cleo" Demetriou (born 23 April 2001) is a Cyprus-born Olivier Award-winning British child actress most known for playing the main role in Matilda the Musical in London's West End. She is also known for playing the role of Lily Hampton in the CBBC show So Awkward, and for singing the soundtrack "Made of Paper" to accompany the short film Mâché Man.

Early life and career 
Demetriou was born in Cyprus, and lived in Putney in south-west London throughout her primary school years at Brandlehow Primary School; she subsequently attended Chailey Secondary School and later Imberhorne School.

She is best known for her role as Matilda in the musical of the same name, for which she received the 2012 Laurence Olivier Award for Best Actress in a Musical.

She made her professional stage debut in 2009 playing Gretl in the Sound of Music, and has performed on stage in Enron and Les Misérables.

Demetriou made her television debut in the CBBC sitcom So Awkward playing Lily Hampton. The show, which was first aired on 21 May 2015, follows three socially awkward teenage girls at school who have the problems of fitting in, annoying parents, and boys to worry about.

In 2018 she was 'gunged' on CBBC's Saturday Mash-Up!, losing the vote by 1% to fellow So Awkward stars Sophia Dall'aglio and Ameerah Falzon-Ojo. On her return to the show in September 2021, Demetriou was gunged again after losing another three way vote.in a second appearance in September 2021, Demetriou was voted to take part in Slime and Punishment and was gunged for a second time.

Filmography

Television

Theatre

Awards and nominations

References

2001 births
Living people
Laurence Olivier Award winners
People from Limassol
People from Putney
British child actresses
British musical theatre actresses
British people of Cypriot descent
21st-century British actresses